Driving Alexandria Safely Home (DASH) is the public bus system for the city of Alexandria, Virginia, operated by the Alexandria Transit Company.

The Alexandria Transit Company's DASH system provides safe, reliable, and courteous bus service within the City of Alexandria, and connects with Metrobus, Metrorail, Virginia Railway Express, and all local bus systems. DASH serves all of the Alexandria Metrorail Stations and the Pentagon Metrorail station.

Alexandria Transit Company (ATC) is a non-profit service corporation wholly owned by the City of Alexandria and currently operates 124 buses, including the King Street Trolley. ATC provides a fixed-route bus service within the City of Alexandria on nine routes and carries more than four million passengers annually. ATC operates transit services within portions of the City of Alexandria and between the City and the Pentagon Transit Station. ATC's purpose is to supplement the regional rail and bus service provided by the Washington Metropolitan Area Transit Authority (WMATA) and to provide a local bus service to the City of Alexandria.

History
In 1981, in anticipation of the opening of the Metrorail stations and the subsequent reordering of Metrobus service, the City Council authorized a feasibility study for a city-sponsored bus system. In 1982, the study recommended a five-route system, using 18 buses.

In 1983, the City Council developed an RFP (Request For Proposal) for management companies to develop a detailed plan for the operation of transit service in the City of Alexandria. The city chose to establish a non-profit public service cooperation that would be wholly owned by the City. This arrangement provided means by which:
 The transit system could be run as a business-type enterprise, and
 City Council could retain overall policy control yet be free from the day-to-day operation of a transit system.
On October 23, 1983, the City Council set up a Transitional Task Force and, on January 24, 1984, instructed the City Attorney to proceed with the incorporation of a non-profit company. The certificate of incorporation was issued by the State Corporation Commission on January 31, and the organizational meeting of the company was held on February 6.

In January 1984, the General Manager employed by the Management Company that was awarded the management contract reported for duty and final preparations began for the opening of revenue service on March 11.

On October 19, 2020, DASH unveiled its first all-electric transit bus at the City Hall of Alexandria.

In September 2021, the entire network was restructured as part of the Alexandra Transit Vision Plan to create a more useful and equitable bus network that encourages more people to get to more places using transit. All Routes were renumbered in the 30s or 100s eliminating the AT designations.

Ridership
DASH carries over 12,000 passengers per weekday within the City of Alexandria, Virginia. The AT8 route, which runs through the Duke Street corridor, is DASH's busiest route with about 3,000 rides per weekday. In 2011, DASH ordered three new 40' Gillig Low Floor diesel-electric hybrid buses, which are 5' longer than the rest of the DASH fleet. These buses went into service in April 2012. Five additional 40' Gillig Low Floor diesel-electric hybrid buses went into service in March 2013. The new 40' buses are used on the AT8 route to reduce crowding. On July 28, 2014, DASH introduced the new AT9 Crosstown Route. The AT9 provides crosstown connections between Mark Center, Southern Towers, Northern Virginia Community College, Bradlee Shopping Center, Shirlington Transit Center in Arlington, Parkfairfax, Arlandria and Potomac Yard.

Fares
, DASH is fare free. Before the free fares, DASH's base fare is $2.00 for riders paying cash or SmarTrip. In 2007, DASH converted its buses to allow the use of the WMATA SmarTrip, an electronic debit farecard. DASH continued to accept and issue paper transfers until they were eliminated altogether January 1, 2013.

Fleet

^operates under the King Street Trolley branding

Retired fleet

Routes

Former Routes

References

External links 
 Official site

Bus transportation in Virginia
Transportation in Alexandria, Virginia